The Chepakovich valuation model is a specialized discounted cash flow valuation model, originally designed for the valuation of “growth stocks” (ordinary/common shares of companies experiencing high revenue growth rates), and subsequently applied to the valuation of high-tech companies - even those that are (currently) unprofitable. 
Relatedly, it is a general valuation model and can also be applied to no-growth or negative growth companies. 
In fact, in the limiting case of no growth in revenues, the model yields similar (but not identical) results to a regular discounted cash flow to equity model. 
The model was developed by Alexander Chepakovich in 2000 and enhanced in subsequent years.

Features and assumptions

The key distinguishing feature of the Chepakovich valuation model is separate forecasting of fixed (or quasi-fixed) and variable expenses for the valuated company
 
Unlike other methods of valuation of loss-making companies, which rely primarily on use of comparable valuation ratios, and, therefore, provide only relative valuation, the Chepakovich valuation model estimates intrinsic (i.e. fundamental) value.

The model assumes that fixed expenses will only change at the rate of inflation or other predetermined rate of escalation, while variable expenses are set to be a fixed percentage of revenues (subject to efficiency improvement/degradation in the future – when this can be foreseen). 
Chepakovich suggested that the ratio of variable expenses to total expenses, which he denoted as variable cost ratio, is equal to the ratio of total expenses growth rate to revenue growth rate.
 

Other features of the model:
 Variable discount rate (depends on time in the future from which cash flow is discounted to the present) to reflect investor's required rate of return (it is constant for a particular investor) and risk of investment (it is a function of time and riskiness of investment). 
 Long-term convergence of company's revenue growth rate to that of GDP.

See also 
 Stock valuation
 Fundamental analysis

References

Fundamental analysis
Valuation (finance)
Financial models